The Urban Homesteading Assistance Board, or UHAB, is a non-profit organization in New York City that helps create and support self-help housing.  UHAB works with residents to acquire, rehabilitate and manage their apartments. In the process the organization creates and helps sustain high-quality limited-equity housing cooperatives that are to remain affordable, in perpetuity, to people of low and middle-income.

In 1974 UHAB started as a resident advocacy and training group serving residents in foreclosed or abandoned properties in New York City. Since then, UHAB has evolved from a largely assistance and training-focused organization into one of the city's leading developers of affordable housing.

Today, UHAB develops co-ops and also supports, trains and assists residents in many low-income Housing Development Fund Corporation (HDFC)s, citywide.

History

Between 1970 and 1978, New York City lost an average of 3,274 apartments per month as a wave of abandonment and arson swept the city from the Bronx to Brooklyn. By 1976, the city owned 4,611 multifamily buildings that had formerly been rental units, and the unwitting landlord stood to take on several thousand more before the crisis was over.

The Very Reverend James P. Morton, or Dean Morton, a progressive minister working at St. John the Divine, hosted a symposium in fall of 1972. There, led by I.Donald Terner, an urban studies professor from the Massachusetts Institute of Technology the idea of creating viable form of urban homesteading for the city's beleaguered renters was born.

UHAB was founded in April 1974.

Government contracts

UHAB is not a government agency, but a private not-for-profit organization that contracts with the New York City Department of Housing Preservation and Development to perform services such as training of tenants living in certain buildings and co-ops.

One of the larger city contracts is administration of the city's Tenant Interim Lease (TIL) program. TIL assists organized tenant associations in City-owned buildings to develop economically self-sufficient low-income cooperatives where tenants purchase their apartments for $250. Tenants in the TIL program have expressed interest and ability to self-manage their building for a number of years before it is converted legally into a co-op.

UHAB also participates as a developer in New York City Department of Housing Preservation and Development's Third Party Transfer program and receives loans from HPD to rehabilitate buildings.

UHAB also contracts with New York State and the Federal Government to assist homesteaders, tenants, and co-ops.

Squatters
UHAB became the transitional owner of Umbrella House on 2002 until the members got the deed in 2010 following necessary repairs

In 2002, squatters in 11 buildings signed contracts with the city to become official limited-equity co-ops in perpetuity provided the building rehabilitation and resale policy be overseen by UHAB.

The buildings scheduled for conversion include Bullet Space, C-Squat, and ABC No Rio.

Some of the original squatters have disputed the original text in the agreements, and believe it is their right to collect market rate prices on the sales of their units. At present, all the squatters in the agreement are contractually obligated to resell the units at a capped profit, and only to buyers who can meet the income restrictions.

UHAB says the units were intended to be affordable housing, and the city would not have granted the squatters a 40-year property tax break if the project had stipulated market prices.

Development 
The most recent phase of UHAB's work began in 2002, when the company began developing new housing cooperatives from a variety of distressed situations. There are 98 buildings in the development pipeline, and as of mid-2009 the construction had been completed on 70 of them. Four had been recognized and approved as co-ops by the New York State Attorney General's office. By the completion of the development pipeline in 2010, over 2,000 new affordable units will have been created.

Organizing and policy
Since 1998 UHAB organizers have reached out to and engaged thousands of tenants in over 650 buildings across New York City.

Predatory Equity is a phenomenon whereby private equity investors acquire and substantially overleverage rent restricted housing for the explicit purpose of removing regulation, raising rents, and displacing low and moderate income families.  With the recent financial crisis, investors have been unable to realize their anticipated returns.  As a result, many buildings have fallen into foreclosure and serious disrepair.  The Organizing and Policy Department is at the forefront of innovative policy solutions which fight Predatory Equity and lead to opportunities for the preservation and recapture of this housing stock as affordable. This is primarily done through transfers to tenants and tenant endorsed non-profit housing providers.

References

External links
 

Non-profit organizations based in New York City
Housing in New York City
Squatting in the United States
1974 establishments in New York City